Ware High School may refer to:

Ware Junior Senior High School, in Ware, Massachusetts
Ware High School (Augusta, Georgia), a former high school for African Americans
Ware County High School in Ware County, Georgia